Willi Heinrich (August 9, 1920 – July 12, 2005) was a German author.

Biography

Willi Heinrich was born in Heidelberg, Baden-Württemberg. During the Second World War he fought on the Eastern Front with the 1st Battalion 228th Jäger Regiment of the 101st Jäger Division. Over the course of the war, the 101st Jäger Division suffered seven hundred percent casualties - Heinrich himself was wounded five times.

After the war, Heinrich became a writer; his first novel In einem Schloss zu wohnen, written 1950–1952, went unpublished until 1976, when he was an established novelist. His first commercial novel, Das Geduldige Fleisch was published in 1955. The novel is set on the Eastern Front and centres around the conflicts within Heinrich's former unit. An immediate success, the novel was translated to English and published as The Willing Flesh (1956) by Weidenfeld & Nicolson in the U.K., and as Cross of Iron (1957) by Bobbs-Merrill in the U.S.  In 1977, Sam Peckinpah adapted it as the film Cross of Iron, featuring James Coburn as the protagonist anti-hero Rolf Steiner.

Though he began as a war genre novelist, Heinrich concentrated in the potboiler genre of soapy, sexy stories that were very popular in the 1970s and 1980s. Most of his books are novels, but Erzählungen (1985) is an anthology comprising three novellas: Die Freundinnen, Fata Morgana, and Harte Bandagen. His last book, Der Gesang Der Sirenen (The Singing of the Sirens), was published in 1994.

Willi Heinrich died in Dobel, near Karlsruhe, in 2005.

Bibliography

Das geduldige Fleisch (1955 – English editions: The Willing Flesh  UK, 1956, and Cross Of Iron, US, 1956)
Der Goldene Tisch (1956 – English edition: The Mark Of Shame, 1957)
Die Gezeichneten (1958 – English edition: The Savage Mountain, 1958)
Alte Häuser sterben nicht (1960 – English edition: The Crumbling Fortress, 1963)
Gottes zweite Garnitur (1962)
Ferien im Jenseits (1964)
Maiglöckchen oder ähnlich (1965)
Mittlere Reife (1966)
Geometrie einer Ehe (1967)
Schmetterlinge weinen nicht (1967)
In Stolzer Trauer (1970)
Jahre wie Tau (1971)
So long, Archie (1972)
Liebe und was sonst noch zählt (1974 – English edition: Rape Of Honour, 1974)
Ein Handvoll Himmel (1976)
In einem Schloß zu wohnen (1976)
Ein Mann ist immer unterwegs (1978)
Herzbube & Mädchen (1980)
Allein gegen Palermo (1981)
Vermögen vorhanden (1982)
Traumvogel (1983)
Männer zum Wegwerfen (1985)
Erzählungen (1985, anthology of three novellas: "Fata Morgana", "Die Freundinnen", "Harte Bandagen")
Die Verführung (1986)
Zeit der Nymphen (1987)
Der Väter Ruhm (1988)
Der Reisende der Nacht (1989)
Eine spanische Affäre (1990)
Ein Herz für Frauen (1992)
Puppenspiele (1993)
Der Gesang der Sirenen (1994)

Film adaptations
Gottes zweite Garnitur, directed by Paul Verhoeven (1967, TV film)
Cross of Iron, directed by Sam Peckinpah (1977)

External links
 

1920 births
2005 deaths
Writers from Heidelberg
German Army personnel of World War II
War writers
People from the Republic of Baden
German male writers